A unitized regenerative fuel cell (URFC) is a fuel cell based on the proton exchange membrane which can do the electrolysis of water in regenerative mode and function in the other mode as a fuel cell recombining oxygen and hydrogen gas to produce electricity. Both modes are done with the same fuel cell stack

By definition, the process of any fuel cell could be reversed. However, a given device is usually optimized for operating in one mode and may not be built in such a way that it can be operated backwards. Fuel cells operated backwards generally do not make very efficient systems unless they are purpose-built to do so as in high pressure electrolyzers, unitized regenerative fuel cells and regenerative fuel cells.

History
Livermore physicist Fred Mitlitsky studied the possibilities of reversible technology.  In the mid-1990s  Mitlitsky received some funding from NASA for development of Helios and from the Department of Energy for leveling peak and intermittent power usage with sources such as solar cells or wind turbines. By 1996 he produced a 50-watt prototype single proton-exchange membrane cell which operated for 1,700 ten-minute charge-discharge cycles, and degradation was less than a few percent at the highest current densities. A rated power of 18.5 kW URFC  was installed in the Helios and was tested on-board during test flights in 2003. The aircraft unfortunately crashed on its second URFC test flight June 26, 2003.

See also

 Glossary of fuel cell terms
 Hydrogen technologies

References

External links
 2003-Unitized regenerative fuel cell system development
 2005-Development of an oxygen electrode for a URFC

Fuel cells
Electrolysis
Hydrogen production